The 32nd Central American Championships in Athletics were held at the Estadio Nacional in San José, Costa Rica, between June 26–27, 2021. 

A total of 44 events were contested (one as exhibition), 22 by men and 22 by women.  In total, 9 championships records were set.  Costa Rica won the overall team trophy.

Medal summary
Complete results were published.

Men

Women

† Exhibition

Medal table (unofficial)

Participation
According to an unofficial count, 162 (+ 7 guest) athletes from 7 (+ 3 guest) countries participated.

References

 
Central American Championships
Central American Championships in Athletics
Central American Championships in Athletics
International athletics competitions hosted by Costa Rica